Small and Medium Enterprises Development Authority (SMEDA) is an autonomous institution of the Government of Pakistan under Ministry of Industries and Production. SMEDA was established in October 1998 for encouraging and facilitating the development and growth of small and medium enterprises in the country.

SMEDA is not only an SME policy-advisory body for the government of Pakistan but also facilitates other stakeholders in addressing their SME development agendas.

See also
Pakistan Industrial Development Corporation

References

External links
 Small and Medium Enterprise Development Authority (SMEDA)

Pakistan federal departments and agencies
1998 establishments in Pakistan
Government agencies established in 1998
Organizations related to small and medium-sized enterprises
Business incubators of Pakistan
Ministry of Industries and Production (Pakistan)